= UWW =

UWW may refer to:

- United World Wrestling, formerly known as the International Federation of Associated Wrestling Styles (FILA), the governing body of international amateur wrestling and grappling
- University of Wisconsin–Whitewater, in Whitewater, Wisconsin
